Nagpur North Assembly constituency is one of the 288 Vidhan Sabha (legislative assembly) constituencies of Maharashtra state in western India. It is one of the six assembly seats which make up  Nagpur Lok Sabha seat. The constituency is represented by Dr. Nitin Raut, who serves as minister in Government of Maharashtra.

Members of Legislative Assembly

2019 results

References

Assembly constituencies of Nagpur district
Politics of Nagpur
Assembly constituencies of Maharashtra